powerHouse Books is an independent publisher of art and photography books founded in 1995 by Daniel Power, based near the Brooklyn waterfront of DUMBO in The powerHouse Arena.

The powerHouse Arena also serves as a gallery, bookstore, and event space often used to promote artists working with the publisher.

Details
powerHouse primarily focuses on photography. Prominent photographers published by the firm include Lee Friedlander, Jamel Shabazz, Boogie, Nobuyoshi Araki, Edward Mapplethorpe, Arlene Gottfried, Ricky Powell, Jack Pierson, Vivian Maier, Ron Galella, Helen Levitt, Harry Benson, Danny Lyon, and the cooperative Magnum Photos. In November 2008, the book Yes We Can: Barack Obama's History-Making Presidential Campaign by Scout Tufankjian sold out its initial print of 55,000 a month before its official December release, prompting powerHouse to print 22,000 more copies.

It also publishes artists known for work in other fields. It partnered with Charlie Ahearn on Wild Style: The Sampler, a behind-the-scenes look at Ahearn's 1982 Wild Style, considered the first hip hop film.  Visual artists published include John Lurie, Francesco Clemente, Richard Prince, Kehinde Wiley, and George Condo.  Actors and filmmakers published include Diane Keaton, Jeff Bridges, Richard Lewis, Jessica Lange, David Lynch, and Brett Ratner. Musicians include Richard Hell, DJ Stretch Armstrong, Mike McCready, KRS-One, Gene Simmons, and The Beastie Boys.

In 2020 it established a literary imprint called Archway Editions with Chris Molnar (of The Writer's Block) and Nicodemus Nicoludis, which will publish work by Ishmael Reed, John Farris, Masha Tupitsyn, Paul Schrader, Mike Sacks, Stacy Szymaszek, Blake Butler, Alice Notley, and more, including anthologies from cokemachineglow as well as the Unpublishable and Archways reading series.

References

External links
powerHouse Books website

Book publishing companies based in New York (state)
Visual arts publishing companies
Publishing companies established in 1995
Dumbo, Brooklyn